Geneva is a neo-grotesque or "industrial" sans-serif typeface designed by Susan Kare for Apple Computer. It is one of the oldest fonts shipped with Macintosh operating systems. The original version was a bitmap font, but later versions were converted to TrueType when that technology became available on the Macintosh platform. Because this Macintosh font is not commonly available on other platforms, many users find Verdana, Microsoft Sans Serif or Arial to be an acceptable substitute.

Geneva was originally a redesigned version of the famous Linotype typeface Helvetica; the TrueType version of the font is somewhat different. Helvetica is named after the Latin name for Switzerland, home country of its original designer Max Miedinger; Geneva is Switzerland's second-largest city.

The bitmap version varied by appearance in different sizes; in smaller sizes, the lowercase i, j and l had serifs on the top, the lowercase y was parallel, the centre vertex of the uppercase M was much higher, and the 3 had a flat top. Larger sizes of the font depicted said characters as they appear in the TrueType version. From Mac OS 8.5 onwards, the bitmap version removed said serifs from the lowercase i, j and l and the lowercase y became angled like in the TrueType version, but the 3 kept the flat top. The bitmap designs are still available on newer versions of the Terminal app.

Unusually for neo-grotesque faces, later versions of Geneva include a basic set of ligatures and the archaic long s and R rotunda as alternates.

A slightly modified version of Geneva, called Simple, was included in the Apple Newton operating system.

Osaka, a default Japanese gothic typeface for Mac OS, also derived from Geneva typeface.

References
 
 Notes on 4 Apple Fonts – a description of the design of the TrueType versions of Chicago, New York, Geneva and Monaco.

Apple Inc. typefaces
Grotesque sans-serif typefaces
Typefaces and fonts introduced in 1984
Neo-grotesque sans-serif typefaces
Typefaces designed by Susan Kare